The Book of Daniel is a 2013 drama film based on the story of Daniel from the Bible. Directed by Anna Zielinski, and produced by Michael Scott, David A.R. White, Russell Wolfe and Anna Zielinski. This straight-to-DVD drama stars Lance Henriksen, Robert Miano and Andrew Bongiorno.

Plot
In Jerusalem in 605 BC, Daniel is a slave who serves Babylonian King Nebuchadnezzar. Daniel proves to be a trusted advisor and becomes one of Nebuchadnezzar's wise men. However during the reign of Darius, he is forced to make a life-or-death decision to prove his faith in God, subjecting himself to the dangers of a lions’ den.

Main cast
 Robert Miano as Old Daniel
 Andrew Bongiorno as Daniel
 Lance Henriksen as Cyrus
 Kevin McCorkle as Croesus 
 Rolf Saxon as Nebuchadnezzar
 Peter Kluge as Darius

Notes

External links

The Book of Daniel movie trailer at YouTube

Films set in the 7th century BC
Films set in Jerusalem
Cultural depictions of Daniel (biblical figure)
Films based on the Hebrew Bible
Pure Flix Entertainment films
2013 films
2013 drama films
2010s American films
2010s English-language films
Films produced by Russell Wolfe
Films produced by David A. R. White